The 2000 Clipsal 500 Adelaide was the second running of the Adelaide 500 race. Racing was held form Friday 7 April until Sunday 9 April 2000. The race was held for V8 Supercars and was Round 3 of the 2000 Shell Championship Series.

Format 
The format, unique to V8 Supercar and loosely similar to the Pukekohe 500 format, splits the 500 kilometres into two separate 250 kilometres races each held on a different day. Unlike the 1999 race the two races were no longer combined into a single timesheet. Points were still assigned separately to the races, and they combined to award a round result.

Official results

Top ten shootout
Results sourced from:

Leg 1
Results sourced from:

Leg 2
Results sourced from:

Round results

Statistics
 Provisional Position - #18 Paul Radisich - 1:25.0687
 Pole Position - #34 Garth Tander - 1:26.0315
 Fastest Lap - #34 Garth Tander - 1:27.0352

External links
 Official race results
 Official V8 Supercar website

References

April 2000 sports events in Australia
Adelaide 500
Clipsal 500
2000s in Adelaide